Daphne H. Wilkinson (born 17 April 1932) is a retired English freestyle swimmer. Wilkinson competed in the 400 metre event at the 1952 Summer Olympics, but failed to reach the final. She won a bronze medal in the 4×110 yd relay at the 1954 British Empire and Commonwealth Games representing England . She won the 1951 ASA National Championship 220 yards freestyle title and three ASA National Championship 440 yards freestyle titles in 1950, 1951 and 1952.

References

1932 births
Living people
British female swimmers
Olympic swimmers of Great Britain
Swimmers at the 1952 Summer Olympics
Place of birth missing (living people)
Commonwealth Games bronze medallists for England
Commonwealth Games medallists in swimming
Swimmers at the 1954 British Empire and Commonwealth Games
Medallists at the 1954 British Empire and Commonwealth Games